Opuntia robusta, the wheel cactus, nopal tapon, or camuesa,  is a species of cactus in the family Cactaceae.

Description

The flattened stem segments are fleshy, round and blue-grey in colour. Yellow, sessile flowers with a fleshy base are produced on the edges of the upper stem segments.

Opuntia robusta has populations that are dioecious, hermaphrodite, or trioecious (containing male, female, and hermaphrodite individuals).

Taxonomy
The species was first formally described in 1837 in Enumeratio Diagnostica Cactearum hucusque Cognitarum. It has naturalised in the states of South Australia, New South Wales, Queensland and Victoria in Australia.

Images

References

robusta
Endemic flora of Mexico
Cacti of Mexico